The House at 306 Broadway in Methuen, Massachusetts is a well-preserved example of a modest Greek Revival house built c. 1830.  It is of a type that was somewhat common in Methuen from the 1830s to the 1850s.  It is a -story wood-frame structure with its gable end facing the street, but its entry centered on the long side wall.  The front was originally three asymmetrically located windows, but this has since been replaced by a virtual wall of five windows.  The corners of the house are pilastered in typical Greek Revival fashion, and the gable end has a deep cornice.  The main entrance is centered on the five-bay side wall, and features a transom window over the door.

The house was listed on the National Register of Historic Places in 1984.

See also
 National Register of Historic Places listings in Methuen, Massachusetts
 National Register of Historic Places listings in Essex County, Massachusetts

References

Houses completed in 1830
Houses in Methuen, Massachusetts
National Register of Historic Places in Methuen, Massachusetts
1830 establishments in Massachusetts
Houses on the National Register of Historic Places in Essex County, Massachusetts